The Union Pacific Missouri River Bridge is a rail truss bridge across the Missouri River between Council Bluffs, Iowa, and Omaha, Nebraska.

History
When the first railroad bridge on the site opened on March 27, 1872, it connected the First transcontinental railroad to the eastern United States. The bridge was rebuilt twice, with the current bridge opening on December 20, 1916.

When the Union Pacific began heading west from Omaha in 1862 there were no railroads connecting to it from the east. After the Chicago and North Western Railway reached Council Bluffs in 1867, the Union Pacific for a while tried to run freight trains across the frozen river during the winter. The Union Pacific Transfer company maintained a ferry service from 1866 to 1872. The bridge became the property of the UP when it absorbed the C&NW in 1995.

In 1869 the transcontinental railroad was completed. An 1871 report to stockholders has this description:

During the 3 years of construction, around 500 men were constantly employed during the construction of the bridge. To place the piers, iron columns were sunk into the water and air pressure was used to displace the water in the column at which point, men entered the column and dug out the sand underneath allow the column to sink until it reached bedrock. The columns were then filled with rock and concrete to form a base for the masonry piers above the water line. 

The new single-track railway bridge was completed in 1872 at a cost of $1.75 million ($ in present day terms). In 1877, a tornado weakened the two easternmost spans, requiring them to be replaced with a wooden trestle. 

In 1885, to keep pace with the growing demand for railway transportation, construction began on a new bridge. Designed and built under the direction of George S. Morison, it opened in the fall of 1887. It was the first double-track railway bridge across the Missouri River.

The 1887 bridge also became obsolete. The peak year for American railroad track mileage was 1916. Nearly all interstate commerce went by rail. Six trunk lines of railroad used this bridge, with an average 320 freight and passenger trains crossing every 24 hours. Union Pacific decided to upgrade the Missouri River crossing to handle the traffic and tonnage, and work began in May 1916. To keep this critical artery open, the replacement bridge was constructed on temporary wooden piles immediately upstream of the 1888 stone piers. Another set of piles was driven into the river bed on the downstream side of the piers. When the new bridge was completed the old bridge was rigged with cables and winched from the stone piers to the temporary wood piles. The cables were rerigged to the new structure and it was pulled onto the stone piers. Tracks were connected and traffic resumed with just one hour of interruption. The 1888 bridge was then dismantled. 

The approaches to the bridge were a mile and a half on each side. The Union Pacific initially committed to including a roadway with the bridge. However, it recanted, and it would not be until 1888 when the Douglas Street Bridge, later called the Ak-Sar-Ben Bridge, was opened as a roadway connecting the cities.

See also
List of bridges documented by the Historic American Engineering Record in Iowa
List of bridges documented by the Historic American Engineering Record in Nebraska
List of crossings of the Missouri River

References

External links
1871 Stockholder Report (via cprr.org)
Aerial shots of the bridge
History of Omaha and the bridge
Historic images of the bridge - Nebraska Memories

Railroad bridges in Iowa
Railroad bridges in Nebraska
Historic bridges in Omaha, Nebraska
Missouri River
Bridges over the Missouri River
Buildings and structures in Council Bluffs, Iowa
Bridges completed in 1872
Bridges completed in 1916
Bridges in Pottawattamie County, Iowa
Historic American Engineering Record in Iowa
Historic American Engineering Record in Nebraska
Interstate railroad bridges in the United States
1873 establishments in Iowa
1873 establishments in Nebraska